Marcos Ugarte (born December 2, 1992) is an American soccer player who plays as a midfielder.

Career

Youth and college
Ugarte played high school soccer at the Providence Country Day School and then went off to college soccer at Providence College and the University of Michigan between 2011 and 2014.

Ugarte also appeared for Premier Development League club Michigan Bucks between 2013 and 2014.

Professional
Ugarte signed with United Soccer League club Rochester Rhinos on March 26, 2015.

Ugarte missed 2017 due to injury, before joining Danish side Ringkøbing IF in 2018. On December 19, 2018, Ugarte joined Birmingham Legion FC after attending an open tryout for the club.

References

External links
 Friars profile
 Wolverines profile

1992 births
Living people
American expatriate sportspeople in Denmark
American soccer players
Association football midfielders
Birmingham Legion FC players
Flint City Bucks players
Michigan Wolverines men's soccer players
Providence Friars men's soccer players
Ringkøbing IF players
Rochester New York FC players
Soccer players from Rhode Island
Spanish emigrants to the United States
Footballers from Madrid
Sportspeople from Providence, Rhode Island
USL Championship players
USL League Two players
Michigan Wolverines men's soccer coaches